The Nigar Award for Best Actor, also known as Nigar Public Film Award for Best Actor is an award constituted for the cinema of Pakistan to recognise contribution of a lead actor in Lollywood. Established in 1958 by Ilyas Rashidi, it is presented annually by Nigar magazine as part of its annual ceremony of Nigar Awards. The award ceremony takes place independently and is not associated with any government or for-profit entities such as production house or television channel.

The first Best Actor award ceremony took place in 1957 and was given to Santosh Kumar for Waada (1957). The last award was given to Fahad Mustafa in 2017 for Actor in Law.

Superlatives

Multiple winners 
17 Wins:  Nadeem
 8 Wins: Mohammad Ali
 5 Wins: Sultan Rahi
 5 Wins: Jawed Sheikh
 4 Wins: Waheed Murad
 4 Wins: Shaan Shahid
 4 Wins: Moammar Rana
 3 Wins: Santosh Kumar
2 Wins:  Darpan
2 Wins: Habib
2 Wins: Sudhir
2 Wins: Ali Ejaz
2 Wins: Mustafa Qureshi
2 Wins: Umer Shareef
2 Wins: Izhar Qazi

Winners and nominees

1950s

1960s

1970s

1980s

1990s

2000s

References

Further reading 
 
 

Nigar Awards